Luis Garrido (born 1990), Honduran football player.

Luis Garrido may also refer to:

Politics
Luis B. Garrido Ampuero, Chilean politician, governor of El Loa
Luis Garrido Juaristi in list of mayors of Madrid (1918–1920)
Luis Javier Garrido (1941–2012), Mexican political analyst

Others
Luis Garrido (sport shooter), Puerto Rican shooter
Luis Fernando Garrido, Colombian discus thrower in 1983 South American Junior Championships in Athletics and athletics at the 1989 Bolivarian Games
Luis de Garrido (born 1967), Spanish architect
José Luis Garrido, got 20th Goya Awards for best original score in 2006
Juan Luis Suárez Garrido, Spanish guitarist of El Sueño de Morfeo
Luis Ramón Garrido, Mexican badminton player